James Louis O'Donel (1737, Knocklofty, County Tipperary, Ireland – April 1, 1811, Waterford, Ireland) was the first Roman Catholic bishop of St. John's, Newfoundland.

Life
O'Donel was born into a prosperous family and received a classical education before entering the Franciscan order. After the Penal Laws ceased to be rigorously enforced, he travelled to Rome to study for the priesthood, becoming ordained in 1770. He later taught philosophy and theology in Prague, and in 1777 became the Franciscan Prior in Waterford.

Following developments in England, Catholics in Newfoundland gradually gained religious liberty, made explicit by a public declaration by the Governor in 1784. After a request from Irish merchants there to Bishop William Egan, O'Donel was sent to St. John's as Prefect Apostolic the same year, largely to deal with the presence of "unlicensed" and "unruly" priests on the island. In addition to his personal popularity, one of his qualifications for the position was an ability to preach in Irish language in Newfoundland.

O'Donel found that insubordinate priests were fighting Irish battles, and set about reorganizing the Catholic Church in Newfoundland. He built a chapel in St. John's, established parishes outside the capital, and gradually brought priests under his authority. During his first few years in post, O'Donel also found that Catholic liberty was less than absolute, and in 1786 in he was physically assaulted by Prince William Henry, later King William IV. In 1796, O'Donel became a bishop, consecrated as titular bishop of Thyatira at Quebec on 21 September.

O'Donel's ministry in Newfoundland was largely characterized by trying to maintain peace, both between fellow Catholics and with the British. In 1800, an incipient Irish uprising involving soldiers in the St. John's garrison was forestalled when O'Donel, upon hearing of the plans, alerted the authorities. The 19th-century historian Charles Pedley alleged that O'Donel received his information via the confessional, but credible evidence for this claim is absent.

O'Donel's health deteriorated in the early 19th century, and he resigned his position in 1807 and returned to Ireland. He died of shock in 1811 after suffering minor injuries in a fire.

Views
Theologically, O'Donel subscribed to the Augustinian position that religion imposes a "reverential fear" on mankind's "naturally licentious" nature. This, and his belief in the essential mystery of the divine nature gave rise to his support for religious tolerance, since God's inscrutability would inevitably lead to theological disagreement, but furthermore, as he wrote to his contemporary John Jones, "an observant [C]hristian of any denomination is...a better man".

See also
United Irish Uprising
 Thomas Nash (Newfoundland) Irish fisherman, settled in Newfoundland and Labrador, Canada. Founder of Branch, Newfoundland and Labrador

References

External links
FitzGerald, John Edward, Bishop James Louis O'Donel
Rollmann, Hans, John Jones, James O'Donel, and the Question of Religious Tolerance in Eighteenth-Century Newfoundland: A Correspondence
Rollmann, Hans, Prince William Henry in Newfoundland
Shortt, Seamus and Gannon, Joseph E., United Irish Rising in Newfoundland

1737 births
1811 deaths
18th-century Roman Catholic bishops in Canada
19th-century Roman Catholic bishops in Canada
Apostolic prefects
Irish emigrants to Canada (before 1923)
18th-century Irish Roman Catholic priests
Roman Catholic bishops of St. John's, Newfoundland
People from County Tipperary
Irish Franciscans
Franciscan bishops